Homeyl (also Romanized as Ḩomeyl, Humeyl, or Homeil) is a city and capital of Homeyl District, in Eslamabad-e Gharb County, Kermanshah Province, Iran.  At the 2006 census, its population was 1,303, in 306 families.

References

Populated places in Eslamabad-e Gharb County

Cities in Kermanshah Province
Kurdish settlements in Kermanshah Province